Diner is a type of North American restaurant.

Diner may also refer to:

 A diner, a person who dines or eats
 A dining car on a train, a restaurant

Games 
 Diner, 1987 video game by INTV Corporation and sequel to BurgerTime
 Diner (pinball), 1990 arcade game

Films 
 Diner (1982 film), an American film written and directed by Barry Levinson
 Diner (2019 film), a Japanese film directed by Mika Ninagawa, based on a novel by Yumeaki Hirayama

People 
 Helen Diner (1874–1948), an Austrian writer
 Diners, the stage name of guitar pop musician Tyler Broderick

Other uses 
 Andorran diner, commemorative coin of Andorra
 Diners Club, credit card company
 Unscrupulous diner's dilemma, in game theory

See also 
 Dinner